Stephen or Steven Martin may refer to:

Stephen Martin (Australian politician) (born 1948), Australian politician and senior academic
Stephen Martin (field hockey) (born 1959), Northern Irish Olympic field hockey player
Stephen F. Martin, American chemist and professor of chemistry at the University of Texas at Austin
Stephen H. Martin (born 1956), American Republican politician from Virginia
Stephen J. Martin (born 1971), Irish writer of contemporary comic fiction
Steven M. Martin (born 1954), actor and filmmaker
S. I. Martin (born 1961), historian and novelist
Stephen Martin (businessman) (born 1966), businessman and director general of the Institute of Directors
Stephen A. Martin (1871–1957), American politician from the state of Iowa

See also
Steve Martin (disambiguation)
Martin Stephan (1777–1846), pastor of St. John Lutheran Church in Dresden, Germany
Martin Stephen (born 1949), headmaster of St Paul's School in London 
Martin Stephens (disambiguation)